"Família" is the seventh single by Brazilian rock band Titãs, released in 1987. The song is about the everyday issues of a family.

It was once covered by Molejo on their 1998 album Família. The song was featured on the Rede Manchete telenovela Corpo Santo.

In 2013, bass player and vocalist Nando Reis (now an ex-member) recorded a new version of the song with his sons Théo and Sebastião. The new version is being used as the opening theme of the 2013 season of Rede Globo's Malhação. While Sebastião played acoustic guitar, Nando Reis and Théo sang, sharing the same microphone, like The Beatles used to do, "in order to create a more familiar atmosphere", according to Reis.

Personnel 
 Nando Reis — lead vocals, bass
 Arnaldo Antunes — backing vocals
 Branco Mello — backing vocals
 Paulo Miklos — backing vocals
 Marcelo Fromer — lead guitar
 Tony Bellotto — rhythm and lead guitar
 Sérgio Britto — keyboards
 Charles Gavin — drums
 Liminha — rhythm guitar

References 

1987 singles
Titãs songs
1986 songs
Reggae songs
Songs written by Tony Bellotto
Songs about families